Set in Stone is the second solo album by former Westlife member Brian McFadden. The album was released in Australia and New Zealand on 19 April 2008. It was released in the UK and Europe in the summer.

Singles
The first single released in Australia and New Zealand was a new version of "Like Only a Woman Can". The second single released was "Twisted", according to the Herald Sun. "Twisted" was released both as a physical and digital single on 19 July. The first single in UK and Europe was "Everything But You", however, it failed to chart in the UK or Ireland. It was also the third single in Australia, peaking at #99 on the ARIA Singles Chart on downloads alone.

Set in Stone peaked at #5 on the ARIA Albums Chart.

Track listing

Release history

References

External links
 'Brian McFadden - Set In Stone' on iTunes

2008 albums
Brian McFadden albums